Asinansi Nyakato, also known as Kamanda, is a Ugandan politician and member of Parliament-elect for the Hoima District in the 11th parliament for 2021 to 2026. She is affiliated to the Forum for Democratic Change party(FDC).

Background and education 
Nyakato is a princess of Bunyoro Kitara Kingdom. She holds a Bachelor's degree in Social Work from Ndejje University.

Career 
Nyakato is a joint opposition candidate. In 2011, she contested for the Hoima female parliamentary seat and emerged as runner up after losing to Ms Tophas Kaahwa Byagira. In August 2011, she joined the Parliament of Uganda where she worked as a policy analyst up to 2016. She is an FDC National Executive Member where she serves as secretary for health services. She is also the FDC Hoima Municipality general secretary. She previously served as secretary for environment in the FDC youth league. She later returned to advocate for the communities affected by the oil and gas developments in the Albertine graben.

References 

Ugandan politicians
Ndejje University alumni
Living people
Year of birth missing (living people)
21st-century Ugandan politicians